Perotrochus tosatoi is a species of sea snail, a marine gastropod mollusk in the family Pleurotomariidae.

Description
The length of the shell varies between 75 mm and 90 mm.

Distribution
This marine species occurs off French Guiana at a depth of 200 m.

References

 Anseeuw, P., Y. Goto and M. Abdi. 2005. Description of a new pleurotomariid (Gastropoda: Pleurotomariidae) from French Guiana: Perotrochus tosatoi sp. nov. Visaya 1(4): 4-14

External links
 

Pleurotomariidae
Gastropods described in 2005